The 2019 Christy Ring Cup was the 15th staging of the Christy Ring Cup hurling championship since its establishment by the Gaelic Athletic Association in 2005. It is the third tier of senior inter-county hurling.

The competition began on 11 May 2019 and ended on 22 June 2019.

Kildare were the 2018 Christy Ring champions, defeating London by 3-19 to 1-11 in the final. Kildare lost the relegation/promotion game against Antrim and remained in the Christy Ring Cup in 2019.

Team changes

To Championship 
Relegated from the Joe McDonagh Cup

 Meath

Promoted from the Nicky Rackard Cup

 Donegal

From Championship 
Promoted to the Joe McDonagh Cup

 None

Relegated to the Nicky Rackard Cup

 Armagh
 Mayo

Competition format

In 2018 the Christy Ring Cup changed to an initial stage of two groups of four teams, having previously been held as a double elimination tournament. The 2019 competition retains this structure.

The top two teams in the two groups advance to the semi-finals with the winners meeting in the final.

Relegation and promotion

The 2019 Christy Ring champions contest will be automatically promoted to the 2020 Joe McDonagh Cup. This is a change to the 2018 format, where the champions had to contest a promotion/relegation playoff against the second-from-bottom team in the Joe McDonagh Cup. (This was because the 2018 Joe McDonagh Cup was contested by six teams, instead of the intended five, and while one McDonagh team had to be relegated for 2019, allowances also had to be made for a Christy Ring Cup team to be promoted on merit.)

The bottom teams meet in a relegation playoff with the losers relegated to the following year's Nicky Rackard Cup.

Group stage

Group 1

Group 1 Table

{| class="wikitable" style="text-align:center"
!width=20|
!width=150 style="text-align:left;"|Team
!width=20|
!width=20|
!width=20|
!width=20|
!width=50|
!width=50|
!width=20|
!width=20|
!Qualification
|- style="background:#ccffcc"
|1||align=left| Down||3||2||0||1||94||75||19||4
| rowspan="2" |Advance to Knockout Stage
|- style="background:#ccffcc"
|2||align=left| Derry||3||2||0||1||65||56||9||4
|-  
|3||align=left| Wicklow ||3||2||0||1||68||65||3||4
|
|- style="background:#ffcccc"
|4||align=left| Donegal ||3||0||0||3||56||87||-31||0
|Advance to Relegation Playoff
|}

Round 1

Round 2

Round 3

Group 2

Group 2 Table

{| class="wikitable" style="text-align:center"
!width=20|
!width=150 style="text-align:left;"|Team
!width=20|
!width=20|
!width=20|
!width=20|
!width=50|
!width=50|
!width=20|
!width=20|
!Qualification
|- style="background:#ccffcc"
|1||align=left| Meath||3||3||0||0||85||48||37||6
| rowspan="2" |Advance to Knockout Stage
|- style="background:#ccffcc" 
|2||align=left| Roscommon||3||2||0||1||67||59||8||4
|-
|3||align=left| Kildare ||3||1||0||2||59||75||-16||2
|
|- style="background:#ffcccc" 
|4||align=left| London ||3||0||0||3||53||82||-29||0
|Advance to Relegation Playoff
|}

Round 1

Round 2

Round 3

Knockout stage

Bracket

Semi-finals

The Group 1 winners play the Group 2 runners-up and the Group 2 winners play the Group 1 runners-up.

Final

The winners become the 2019 Christy Ring champions, and are automatically promoted to the 2020 Joe McDonagh Cup.

Christy Ring relegation playoff

The bottom teams in the two groups meet in a relegation playoff. The losers are relegated to the Nicky Rackard Cup and are replaced by the Nicky Rackard Champions.

London retain Christy Ring Cup status for 2020; Donegal are relegated to the Nicky Rackard Cup.

Statistics

Top scorers

Updated to xx May 2019

Overall

In a single game

References

Christy Ring Cup
Christy Ring Cup